Beta-1-syntrophin is a protein that in humans is encoded by the SNTB1 gene.

Function 

Dystrophin is a large, rod-like cytoskeletal protein found at the inner surface of muscle fibers. Dystrophin is missing in Duchenne Muscular Dystrophy patients and is present in reduced amounts in Becker Muscular Dystrophy patients. The protein encoded by this gene is a peripheral membrane protein found associated with dystrophin and dystrophin-related proteins. This gene is a member of the syntrophin gene family, which contains at least two other structurally related genes.

Interactions 

SNTB1 has been shown to interact with Dystrophin.

References

Further reading